Shannon is a rural locality in the local government area (LGA) of Central Highlands in the Central LGA region of Tasmania. The 2016 census did not record a population for the state suburb of Shannon, because it "had no people or a very low population".

History 
Shannon was gazetted as a locality in 1973. The locality was originally called Wihareja.

Geography
The Shannon River forms most of the eastern boundary.

Road infrastructure 
Route C178 (Waddamana Road) runs through from north to south.

References

Towns in Tasmania
Localities of Central Highlands Council